Horror Hospital (also known as Computer Killers) is a 1973 British science-fiction comedy-horror film directed by Antony Balch and starring Robin Askwith, Michael Gough, Dennis Price and Skip Martin.

Plot
When attempts to break into the pop business leave him with nothing but a bloody nose, songwriter Jason Jones (Robin Askwith) decides to take a break with 'Hairy Holidays', an outfit run by shifty, gay travel agent Pollock (Dennis Price). After failing to chat Jason up, Pollock sends him to pseudo-health farm Brittlehurst Manor. On the train journey there, Jason meets Judy (Vanessa Shaw) who is travelling to the same destination to meet her long-lost aunt. Both are unaware that the health farm (i.e. "Horror Hospital") is a front for Dr. Storm (Michael Gough) and his lobotomy experiments that turn wayward hippies into his mindless zombie slaves. The wheelchair-using doctor surrounds himself with an entourage that includes Judy's aunt, erstwhile brothel madam Olga (Ellen Pollock), dwarf Frederick (Skip Martin) and numerous zombie biker thugs. Dr. Storm also has a Rolls-Royce car, fitted with a giant blade that decapitates escapees and interfering parties. Abraham (Kurt Christian) arrives at the Horror Hospital "looking for his chick" and is promptly whacked around the head by the motorcycle zombies. Frederick, fed up at literally being Storm's whipping boy, helps the kids escape—paving the way for the '70s' youth to put the final spanner/wrench in the works to Storm's scheme.

Cast
 Michael Gough	–	Dr. Christian Storm
 Robin Askwith	– 	Jason Jones
 Vanessa Shaw	– 	Judy Peters
 Ellen Pollock	– 	Aunt Harris
 Dennis Price	– 	Mr. Pollack
 Skip Martin – 	Frederick
 Kurt Christian	– 	Abraham Warren
 Barbara Wendy	– 	Millie
 Kenneth Benda	– 	Carter
 Martin Grace	– 	Bike Boy
 Colin Skeaping	– 	Bike Boy
 George Herbert	– 	Laboratory Assistant
 Susan Murphy            – Lobotomy Victim Number 1.
 James Boris IV        – 	"Mystic" Band Member (as James IV Boris)
 Alan Laurence Hudson   –  "Mystic" Band Member (as Allan "The River" Hudson)
 Simon Lust	– 	"Mystic" Band Member 
 Alan Watson	– Transvestite in Club (uncredited)
 Antony Balch	– 	Bearded Man in Club/Bike Boy (uncredited)
 Ray Corbett	– 	Hunting Man (uncredited)
 Richard Gordon	– 	Man in Club (uncredited)

Production

After the success of his feature film debut Secrets of Sex (1969), an anthology sex film that flirted with horror themes, Antony Balch envisioned his second film as an out-and-out horror film and one with a continuous narrative.
Location filming was undertaken in and around Knebworth House near Stevenage, Hertfordshire.

Writing
The script was written by Balch and his friend Alan Watson during the 1972 Cannes Film Festival, although the film's title was thought up before the plot. Among Watson's ideas for the Horror Hospital script was the lethal Rolls-Royce, with its giant blade that decapitated people as it drove by.

Filming
The film was shot during a four-week schedule beginning on 16 October 1972. Shooting was done at Merton Park (mainly the pop group scene), Battersea Town Hall (which provided the interiors of Brittlehurst Manor) and Knebworth House.

The film's last night party on 11 November was compromised when Phoebe Shaw served cake that was laced with drugs. In his autobiography, Askwith wrote "I don’t know what she put in the cake but I ended up with a twenty stone electrician Roy, sitting on my lap telling me he thought he was in love with me." Only producer Richard Gordon managed to avoid eating the cake.

Casting
Robin Askwith's role was specially written for him after he appeared in Gordon's previous 1972 production Tower of Evil. Balch asked Michael Gough to base his performance on Bela Lugosi, screening him a 16mm print of The Devil Bat, in which Lugosi plays a mad, perfume manufacturer.

The female lead was taken by Phoebe Shaw, who had previously appeared in several TV commercials, and was renamed 'Vanessa Shaw' for the film. During filming, Shaw and Askwith briefly became lovers. Her only other known roles were an uncredited bit part in a 1969 American TV adaptation of David Copperfield and brief roles as a boutique assistant in Say Hello to Yesterday (1970) and a police cadet in Ooh… You Are Awful (1972).
'Dwarf' actor Skip Martin (who ran a tobacconist's shop in between acting assignments) and veteran character actor Dennis Price also appeared in the film, as well as Kurt Christian—whose full title was Baron Kurt Christian von Siengenberg, and who left the country not long after the film was released. His ambition at the time, according to Films and Filming magazine, was to "play a role that does not involve killing somebody".

Nicky Henson was originally considered for Christian's role.

Post-production
Horror Hospital also contains a pop music number, "Mark of Death", composed by Jason DeHavilland and performed by the group Mystic (James IV Boris, Alan "The River" Hudson, Simon Lust).

Release

Home media
The film was originally released on DVD in the US by Elite Entertainment on 2 November 1999. A new remastered DVD with a new commentary from producer Richard Gordon was released by Dark Sky Films on 15 June 2010. The DVD release is set for 15 June 2010 by MPI Media Group.

The film was re-released on DVD and released for the first time on Blu-ray in the UK from Odeon on 10 August 2015.

References

External links

1973 films
1973 horror films
1970s comedy horror films
British comedy horror films
British zombie comedy films
1973 comedy films
1970s English-language films
1970s British films